Robert de Saint Jean (1901–1987) was a French writer and journalist. He was the companion of the French-speaking American writer Julien Green. Like the latter, he kept a diary which he published and allows to understand the French cultural life over several decades.

He worked, in particular, to Paris-Soir, le Parisien libéré or Paris Match.

In 1984 he received the prix Marcel Proust. He also worked as editor for the Plon publishing house.

Works 
1934: La vraie révolution de Roosevelt, Éditions Grasset
1941: Démocratie, beurre et canons, Maison de la France, New York; online transcription
1936: Le Feu sacré, Éditions Gallimard
1967: Julien Green par lui-même, Éditions du Seuil
1974: Journal d'un journaliste
1975: Moins cinq
1983: Passé pas mort, Grasset
 Julien Green, with Luc Estang

External links 
  Robert de Saint Jean on Banelio
 Journal de Robert de Saint-Jean on e-gide

20th-century French writers
French diarists
20th-century French journalists
1901 births
1987 deaths
20th-century diarists